Good Brothers may refer to:

Good Brothers (professional wrestling), an American tag team
The Good Brothers, a Canadian musical group